York Township may refer to the following places:

In Canada
 York Township, Ontario, a former municipality, now part of Toronto

In the United States

Arkansas
 York Township, Lonoke County, Arkansas

Illinois
 York Township, Carroll County, Illinois
 York Township, Clark County, Illinois
 York Township, DuPage County, Illinois

Indiana
 York Township, Benton County, Indiana
 York Township, Dearborn County, Indiana
 York Township, Elkhart County, Indiana
 York Township, Noble County, Indiana
 York Township, Steuben County, Indiana
 York Township, Switzerland County, Indiana

Iowa
 York Township, Iowa County, Iowa
 York Township, Pottawattamie County, Iowa
 York Township, Tama County, Iowa

Kansas
 York Township, Stafford County, Kansas

Michigan
 York Charter Township, Michigan, in Washtenaw County

Minnesota
 York Township, Fillmore County, Minnesota

Missouri
 York Township, Putnam County, Missouri
 there is also: New York Township, Caldwell County, Missouri

North Dakota
 York Township, Benson County, North Dakota

Ohio
 York Township, Athens County, Ohio
 York Township, Belmont County, Ohio
 York Township, Darke County, Ohio
 York Township, Fulton County, Ohio
 York Township, Medina County, Ohio
 York Township, Morgan County, Ohio
 York Township, Sandusky County, Ohio
 York Township, Tuscarawas County, Ohio
 York Township, Union County, Ohio
 York Township, Van Wert County, Ohio

Pennsylvania
 York Township, York County, Pennsylvania

South Dakota
 York Township, Day County, South Dakota
 York Township, Hand County, South Dakota

See also

 York (disambiguation)

Township name disambiguation pages